Alyaksandr Myatlitski (born 22 April 1964) is a former Belarusian professional football defender who played for FC Dinamo Minsk in the Soviet Top League, NK Osijek in the Yugoslav First League, and SK Rapid Wien, LASK Linz and ASKÖ Pasching in the Austrian Bundesliga.

Myatlitski made nine appearances for the Belarus national football team.

On 29 December 2009 Alyaksandr was named as a sporting director for Heart of Midlothian.

References

External links
 

1964 births
Living people
Footballers from Minsk
Association football defenders
Soviet footballers
Soviet expatriate footballers
Belarusian footballers
Belarus international footballers
FC Dinamo Minsk players
NK Osijek players
SK Rapid Wien players
LASK players
Soviet Top League players
Austrian Football Bundesliga players
Belarusian expatriate footballers
Soviet expatriate sportspeople in Yugoslavia
Expatriate footballers in Yugoslavia
Yugoslav First League players
Expatriate footballers in Austria
Belarusian expatriate sportspeople in Austria
Heart of Midlothian F.C. non-playing staff